Tank Ex, or Karna Tank, was the code name of the prototype main battle tank developed by the Indian Defence Research and Development Organisation (DRDO) in 2002 as a upgrade of the T-72 based Ajeya. Tank Ex was developed as an attempt to modernize India's existing Ajeya tanks, using technology derived from the development of the Arjun. It was named after Karna, a character from the Indian epic The Mahabharata.  It underwent six months of trials, but was subsequently rejected by the Indian Army. Total eight Tank Ex prototypes were built.

History 
The Tank Ex MBT uses the chassis of the T-72M1 (Ajeya) and turret and weapon system of the Arjun. It was developed in 2002 as a private venture and was intended to provide a solution for upgrading the Indian Army's ageing T-72M1 fleet. It was rejected by the Indian Army after eight prototypes and six months of trials.

On July 5, 2008, Gen. Dalip Bhardwaj, the Indian Army's Director General of Mechanized forces (DGMF), declared that the army had rejected Tank Ex. This was part of an announcement that there would be no further orders for Arjun tanks, and that the military would be inviting participants from various countries to discuss future tank developments.

Specifications 
Weighing in at 47 tons, the Tank Ex is heavier than the T-72M1 (41 tons) and much lighter than the Arjun MBT, (58.4 tons).  It has a  power plant giving a power-to-weight ratio of /ton for a total weight of 47 tons. This represents an improvement over the T-72M1's /ton, with a weight of 41 tons and a  power plant. The Tank Ex utilizes the Arjun MBT's 120 mm rifled gun firing unitary APFSDS and HESH semi combustible cartridge case ammunition. A total of 32 rounds are carried, as compared with 39 in the Arjun and 45 two piece rounds in the T-72. A global positioning system is provided for accurate navigation. This is a feature common to both the Arjun MBT and the Combat Improved Ajeya.

The Tank Ex utilizes the "Kanchan" composite armour, especially over its frontal arc (turret as well as glacis), giving it protection against both Kinetic and HEAT rounds. The usage of the Arjun turret design indicates that the Tank Ex may also have its "ready" ammunition stored in the bustle (as in the Arjun), separated from the crew and provided with blow-off panels. This would be a significant protective feature comparable with Western design practices. The Tank Ex retains the T-72's mobility, with a road speed of 60 km/h and a cross-country speed of 40 km/h. With a maximum gradient climb of 30 degrees, it remains in line with all variants of the T-72, like the T-72BM. The Tank Ex is better at trench crossing with a capability of crossing 2.6 meters as compared to the T-72M1's 2.28 metres. The Tank Ex can also climb vertical obstacles up to 0.85 metres tall. The tank's shallow fording capabilities are quoted as 1.2 metres. The Tank Ex should also have the capability to fire the Israeli LAHAT missile from its gun-barrel, like the Arjun.

References

Main battle tanks of India
Post–Cold War main battle tanks
Defence Research and Development Organisation
Experimental and prototype tanks
T-72